Maria Yllena Munji Laurel, better known as Ayen Munji Laurel (born November 21, 1971) is a Filipina actress and singer. Part of GMA Network from 2009, she transferred to ABS-CBN in late 2015; she later returned to GMA in 2022. She is currently part of the cast of Start-Up PH, the Philippine adaptation of the South Korean TV series Start Up.

Munji was previously married to Jefri Bolkiah, Prince of Brunei, with whom she had a son.

Career
In 2007, she made her acting debut on GMA Network as a full-time actress in evening and primetime programs such as Amaya, co-starring Marian Rivera and an ensemble cast in 2011, 2012 as part of Hiram na Puso with Gina Alajar, Kris Bernal, and also Amaya co-star Gardo Versoza in the critically acclaimed series. She then later starred in the remake of the Korean turned Filipino adaptation of Temptation of Wife in 2012-2013 as Lady Armada with co-star Marian Rivera her second time in that same year. She had a short stint in the 2013 afternoon soap Maghihintay Pa Rin as Bianca King's protagonist mother in a short stint of the series she primarily exited out to star in the film Ang Huling Henya in the sci-fi comedy flick with award-winning comedian Rufa Mae Quinto. In 2014, she resumed her acting in primetime through the romantic-comedy family melodrama My Destiny. In 2015, she jumped to rival station, ABS-CBN, after doing Beautiful Strangers and appeared on various television dramas of the network in either villain or anti-hero roles. Later in 2022 She returned to her home network  GMA Network after 7 years with  ABS-CBN. And she is now part of the Philippine Adaption of Start-Up PH

Filmography

Drama

Films

References

External links

1971 births
Living people
Filipino television actresses
Filipino film actresses
GMA Network personalities
ABS-CBN personalities